Jo Wyatt is an English actress. She is known for her roles as Tweak in The Octonauts and Little Miss Helpful, Little Miss Naughty, Little Miss Scary and Little Miss Sunshine in The Mr. Men Show, as well as Daisy Kribotnik in Love Soup, Natella in Bromwell High, and Mimi in Guess with Jess. She is also known for providing voices in many video games, such as Ciri in The Witcher 3: Wild Hunt, additional voices in Perfect Dark Zero and Dragon Quest VIII as well as narrating To Leo with Love.

Early life
Wyatt was one of the original Minipops. Her father, Martin Wyatt, was the producer. She made a single "Stupid Cupid" in 1982, and reached #1 in France. In 1984, she replaced Patsy Kensit as a new Luna in the second series of the UK science fiction show Luna.

At the age of 13, Wyatt helped to write the words to the theme song of the children's television series Wide Awake Club  for the breakfast television network TV-am with a colleague of her father named Colin Frechter doing the music.

Whilst still a singer, Wyatt has also sung several songs on the vinyl record featuring the Care Bears The Care Bears to the Rescue in 1984 and the first nine songs of the long running children's television series Thomas the Tank Engine & Friends in the early 1990s with Tom and Laura Penta, Louise Roberts and Victoria Ferrer when the series was having sing along songs of its own for the very first time (only seven of them were turned into music videos whilst an early version of Gone Fishing was sung the series' former composer Junior Campbell which can be seen on the US VHS Rusty to the Rescue & Other Stories). Several years later, Wyatt went onto sing several more Thomas songs during the classic era however different children were used for each series.

In 1988, as a teenager, Wyatt wrote and provided the vocals to the theme song to the BBC children's animated series Barney with Frechter also writing the words and composing the music and some members of the Minipops doing additional vocals. In 1989, Wyatt sung a version of Downtown in the compilation Canzoni da Amare-International

Voice acting
Wyatt is known for her voice role in Angelina Ballerina and as Lyra in all the His Dark Materials audio books. She has also read the role of Alice for the audio book of Alice in Wonderland.

She voiced Gracie, one of Angelina's friends, in Angelina Ballerina: The Next Steps. In Dragon Age II, she is the voice of the game's protagonist Hawke, if the player chooses to play as a female.

In The Octonauts, she voices the engineer, Tweak Bunny. She also voiced the character of Scratch in the US dub of Bob the Builder, during the final episodes of the show's classic era.

She also provided the voices of Jennifer in the video game Rule of Rose, the Female Imperial Agent in the video game Star Wars: The Old Republic, Alicia in Ni no Kuni, Meyneth in Xenoblade Chronicles, and Ciri in The Witcher 3: Wild Hunt.

Filmography

Film

Television

Video games

References

External links

 Jo Wyatt at Naxos Audiobooks

Living people
20th-century English actresses
21st-century English actresses
English child actresses
English film actresses
English television actresses
English video game actresses
English voice actresses
Year of birth missing (living people)